Sphaeropteris excelsa,  synonym Cyathea brownii, commonly known as the Norfolk tree fern or smooth tree fern, is probably the largest fern species in the world. It is endemic to Norfolk Island, in the Pacific Ocean near Australia and New Zealand.  It is named after the botanist Robert Brown (1773-1858).

Description
In its natural habitat, Sphaeropteris excelsa is reported to reach  or more in height. The broad, lance shaped, bipinnate-pinnatifid to tripinnate fronds can reach ) in length. Stipe is long and has a line of white, stitch like dashes along its length. Rachis and stipe are covered in white-brown and darker orange-brown scales. The trunk can become smooth with age and may display oval scars left from fallen fronds.

Habitat

Sphaeropteris excelsa occurs naturally in subtropical rainforests on Norfolk Island. Average daytime temperatures reach around  during the summer months falling to around  during the winter.

Conservation
The once extensive forests of Norfolk Island are now reduced to a single small forested area which has been designated part of a national park. Sphaeropteris excelsa is protected within this park. It is available in cultivation in many countries and though rare is not considered endangered.

Cultivation
Sphaeropteris excelsa is cultivated as an ornamental tree.  It requires a neutral to slightly acidic soil rich in organic matter. The soil must be moisture retentive but well drained. The tree fern will suffer if left to stand in waterlogged soil. Sphaeropteris excelsa requires high humidity and either high rainfall or frequent watering. During the summer months even a very young pot grown plant can consume  of water per day.

Sphaeropteris excelsa requires good light but does best when shaded during the hottest parts of the day. It responds well to fertilization but can be intolerant of some commercial fertilizers producing malformed fronds and a larger but weaker plant. It is able to withstand only light frosts. Larger plants may survive overnight temperatures as low as minus three degrees Celsius.

In countries such as Britain it is best grown in a conservatory. Its large size however often makes this impractical. A beautiful and rewarding plant but in colder regions it is strictly for the more dedicated of enthusiasts.

It is easily grown from spore and can be very fast growing when young.

References

excelsa
Ferns of Australia
Flora of Norfolk Island
Endemic flora of Australia
Garden plants of Australia
Ornamental trees